174th Street may refer to the following stations of the New York City Subway in the Bronx:

174th–175th Streets (IND Concourse Line); serving the  trains
174th Street (IRT White Plains Road Line); serving the  trains
174th Street (IRT Third Avenue Line); demolished

See also
 So Long, 174th Street, a Broadway musical opened April 27, 1976